Zakaria Tamer (born January 2, 1931), also spelled Zakariya Tamir, is a Syrian short story writer.

He is one of the most important and widely read and translated short story writers in the Arab world, as well as being the foremost author of children’s stories in Arabic. He also writes children's stories and works as a freelance journalist, writing satirical columns in newspapers.

His volumes of short stories, are often reminiscent of folktales, and are renowned for their relative simplicity on the one hand and the complexity of their many potential references on the other. They often have a sharp edge and are often a surrealistic protest against political or social oppression and exploitation. Most of Zakaria Tamer’s stories deal with people’s inhumanity to each other, the oppression of the poor by the rich and of the weak by the strong. The political and social problems of his own country, Syria, and of the Arab world, are reflected in the stories and sketches in the satirical style typical of his writing.

His first stories were published in 1957. Since then he has published eleven collections of short stories, two collections of satirical articles and numerous children’s books. His works have been translated into many languages, with two collections in English, Tigers on the Tenth Day (translated by Denys Johnson-Davies, Quartet 1985) and Breaking Knees (June 2008).

In 2009 he won the Blue Metropolis Montreal International Literary prize.

Biography

Early life
Zakaria Tamer was born in 1931 in the Al-Basha district of Damascus. He was forced to leave school in 1944, at the age of thirteen in order to help provide for his family. He was  apprenticed to a blacksmith as a locksmith in a factory in the Al-Basha district of Damascus. At the same time, as an autodidact, he spent many hours reading various books, he became interested in politics and was encouraged by contact with intellectuals to continue his education at night school. He read voraciously and was provoked by his reading, as he later said in an interview, "to create a voice which [he] hadn't been able to find [there]". His intention was to represent in his writing the very poor majority of men and women in Syria, with their joyless and restricted existence.

He began his literary career in 1957, when he published some stories in Syrian journals. His first manuscript was noticed by Yusuf al-Khal, the poet, critic and editor of the magazine Shi'r ("Poetry") which at the time was acting as midwife to the birth of modern Arabic poetry. The talent that lay behind the poetical prose of these stories, was so unlike anything being written in Arabic at the time, that Al-Khal  decided to  publish it, this became his first collection of short stories, which was entitled The Neighing of the White Steed.

The collection brought him considerable attention and repute amount readers and critics.

1960–1981 

Following his literary success, which was reflected in the good reception of his first collection, he left his job as a blacksmith and embarked on a new career, as government official, as well as editor of several journals, including the cultural periodicals Al Mawqif al-Adabi, and Al Marifah, and the children’s magazine Usamah.

He was instrumental in the establishment of the Syrian Writers Union in Syria 1968. He was elected member of the executive bureau responsible for the publishing and print, and was  vice-president of the Union for four years.

In 1980 he was dismissed from editing the periodical al-Marifah, published by the Syrian Ministry of Culture, as a result of the publication of extracts from Abd al-Rahman al-kawakibi’s (1849–1902) book, Tabai al istibadad (“The Characteristics of Despotism, 1900), in which the author denounced tyranny and called for freedom. As a result of his dismissal, Tamer decided to travel to London, leaving his home country of Syria.

1980s onwards 
From 1981-1982 he took charge of Al Dustoor magazine as managing editor, he went on to be culture editor of Al Tadhamon magazine (1983–1988) and then became managing editor of Al Naqid magazine (1988–1993), and culture editor at Riyadh Al Rayes Publishing House.

He also wrote for various newspapers and periodicals published in London, including Al-Quds Al-Arabi.

In January 2012, Zakaria Tamer,  decided to venture into Facebook, creating a page titled المهماز (Al-Mihmaz) “The Spur”. The page contains daily articles detailing his continuing literary journey with its political and cultural dimensions. Most recently the focus has been on the Syrian uprising.

Quotes

Awards
 2001: Sultan Bin Ali Al Owais Cultural Foundation:  Prize of Stories Novels & Drama 
 2002: Honoured and invested with the Syrian Order of Merit
 2009: Awarded  the Blue Metropolis Montreal International Literary prize
 2015: Mahmoud Darwish Award for Freedom and Creativity

Themes in writing
A common theme in his writing has been that the strongest of us can gradually be broken and tamed by those who wield the whip of power. Those who rule, Zakaria Tamer tells us in many a story, while devoid of all the noble qualities that should be theirs, possess the intuitive awareness of how to use the carrot and the stick. Muhammad al-Maghut, a well known Arab critic, once contrasted him with Charles Darwin: one showing how humans developed from monkeys, the other showing how humans could be manipulated into becoming monkeys.

Another favorite theme, as seen in such stories as "The Stale Loaf" and the "Room with Two Beds", is the sexual frustration of the young in the Arab world and the toll that is exacted - particularly from the women - when sexual taboos are breached, or are thought to have been breached.

Though humor is not one of the ingredients of these stories, the writer does allow himself an occasional sardonic grin at the forms of injustice to which man is subjected by his rulers, his fellow  men and the circumstances of lives enclosed in routine of ill-rewarded work and unfulfillment. Zakaria Tamer's world is Orwellian though unmistakably Arab. The secret police, with their physical brutalities, feature in many of the stories, as for instance in the dark-humored "A summary of What Happened to Mohammed al-Mahmoudi", where a harmless old man finds that even in death he is not immune from their attention.

The directness and absence of embroidery with which Zakaria Tamer writes is a powerful weapon in giving distinctive form to the basic themes to which he returns again and again.

Works

To date he has published eleven collections of stories, two collections of satirical articles and dozens of children's books.

Short story collections
The Neighing of the White Steed(1960) صهيل الجواد الابيض 
Spring In The Ashes, (1963) ربيع في الرماد 
The Thunder, (1970) الرعد 
Damascus Fire, (1973) دمشق الحرائق  
Tigers on the Tenth Day, (1978) النمور في اليوم العاشر  
Noah's Summons, (1994),نداء نوح  
We Shall Laugh, (1998)  سنضحك 
IF!, (1998)  أف!
Sour Grapes, (2000) الحصرم 
Breaking Knees, (2002) تكسير ركب  
The Hedgehog, (2005) القنفذ 
The Regret of Horse, (2018)ندم الحصان

Collections of satirical articles

Glories, Arabs, Glories, (1986) Amjad Ya Arab amjad
The Victim's Satire Of His Killer, (2003)

Other collections

Why the River Fell Silent, (1973) لماذا سكت النهر  
The Flower Spoke to the Bird, (1978) قالت الوردة للسنونو

In translation
Tigers On The Tenth Day and Other Stories, (1985) translated by Denys Johnson-Davies, Quartet Books
Breaking Knees, (2008), translated by Ibrahim Muhawi (Reading, UK: Garnet Publishing) "The Children Laugh", (2017), translated to Hebrew by Alon Fragman, published by Maktoob Series.

Editorial work

1960-1963, Writers and Publishing Dept. at Syria Ministry of Culture
1963-1965, editor of weekly Al Mawqef Al Arabi, Syria
1965-1966, Screenwriter for Jeddah TV, KSA
1967, started his work at Syria Ministry of Information
1967-1970, Head of Drama Department at Syrian TV
1970-1971, Editor-in-Chief of kids Rafi magazine, Syria
1972-1975, Editor-in-Chief of Al Mawqef Al Adabi magazine, Syria
1975-1977, Editor-in-Chief of kids Osama magazine, Syria
1978-1980, Editor-in-Chief of Al Ma’arifa magazine, Syria
1980-1981, Syria Ministry of Culture
1981-1982, Managing editor of Al Dustoor magazine, London
1983-1988, Culture editor of Al Tadhamon magazine, London
1988-1993, Managing editor of Al Naqid magazine and culture editor at Riyadh Al Rayes Publishing House, London

Other activities

Co-founded Arab Writers Union in Syria 1969, member of its Executive Bureau, and Deputy Chairman for four years
Participated in many literary events in Arab countries
Jury member of many Arab and international literary competitions

Newspaper columns

1989-1994,  Al-Quds Al-Arabi, Wrote daily articles for Al-Quds Al-Arabi newspaper, London
2002, Azzaman Newspaper
2006, Al Tawra Newspaper (Revolution)

See also
 Arabic Literature
 List of short story authors
 List of Syrians

Notes

References

 Encyclopedia of World Literature in the 20th Century Vol. V (Supplement), New York: Ungar,1993.
 Arab Culture 1977: Religious Identity and Radical Perspectives By University E Saint-Joseph, Published 1980, Dar El-Mashreq, 
 Arabic Short Stories By Denys Johnson-Davies, 1983,  Quartet Books Literature, 
 Syria: Society, Culture, and Polity By Richard T. Antoun, 
 Tigers on the Tenth Day and Other Stories By Denys Johnson-Davies(TRN), Zakarīyā Tāmir, Zakaria Tamer, 1985, 
 Islam: Islam, state and politics By Bryan Stanley Turner, Published 2003 Routledge (UK), 
 Dislocating Masculinity: comparative ethnographies By Andrea Cornwall, Nancy Lindisfarne, 
 Salma Khadra Jayyusi, ed., Modern Arabic Fiction: An Anthology'', New York: Columbia University Press (2005)

Further reading

Selected studies
 Damascene Shahrazad: The Images of Women in Zakariyya Tamir’s Short Stories Source: Hawwa 4, no. 1 (2006)
 Bayan Rayhanova. Mythological and Folkloric Motifs in Syrian Prose: The Short Stories of Zakariyya Tamir
  Bulletin of the Israeli Oriental society - التربيه والترويض وما بينهما كما  ينعكس الامر في القصص القصيرة للكاتب السوري زكريا تامر .
 Bulletin of the Israeli Oriental society -الحق للحرية كما يتمثل في أدب الأطفال عند زكريا تامر
 Tishreen University Journal for Studies and Scientific  Research- Arts and Humanities Science Series Vol  (26) No (1) 2004 - الرؤية السردية في قصص زكريا تامر
 Individuation and Literature: Zakariyya. Tamir and his Café Man’ (Emma Westney), Oxford University (1996)
 Alon Fragman, Ben Gurion University: “When the Birds Leave Their Cage: Zakariyya Tamir’s Writing in Exile”
 Peter Dové: Historical and literary figures in the works of Zakariyyā Tāmir, (Historische und literarische Figuren im Werk Zakariyyā Tāmirs, Berne University (2003)

External links
 Journal of Arabic Literature, Volume 16, Number 1, 1985 , pp. 105-108(4),'The Moon Unmasked' By Zakaria Tamer translated by Hugh Pope (Last Accessed 4 June 2008)
 Short Story "The Sleeping Woman"
 Profile from Owais Cultural Foundation
 Encarta Article On contribution to Arabic Literature and the Short Story Genre  
 Short Story "Sprouts" Translation from the Arabic by William Hutchins
 Finding the Music and Rhythm of Zakaria Tamer in English, Interview with translator Alessandro Columbu on ArabLit magazine

1931 births
Living people
Tamer,Zakaria
Tamer,Zakaria
Tamer,Zakaria
Tamer,Zakaria
Tamer,Zakaria